The year 1576 in science and technology included many events, some of which are listed here.

Astronomy
 August 8 – Work begins on Tycho Brahe's Uraniborg observatory on Hven in Øresund.

Botany
 Carolus Clusius publishes Rariorum aliquot stirpium per Hispanias observatarum historia, one of the earliest Floras of the Iberian Peninsula.
 probable date – Leonhard Rauwolf publishes the herbal , the earliest Flora of the Near East.

Exploration
 July 11 – English navigator Martin Frobisher sights Greenland.
 August 11 – English navigator Martin Frobisher, on his search for the Northwest Passage, enters the bay now named after him.

Geophysics
 Robert Norman measures magnetic dip.

Births
 Salomon de Caus, French mechanical engineer (died 1626)
 Angelo Sala Italian doctor and early iatrochemist born in Venice (died 1637)

Deaths
 June 2 – Volcher Coiter, Dutch anatomist (born 1534)
 September 21 – Gerolamo Cardano, Italian mathematician and physician (born 1501)
 Richard Eden, English alchemist and translator of geographical works (born c.1520)

References

 
16th century in science
1570s in science